The 1952 All-Southwest Conference football team consists of American football players chosen by various organizations for All-Southwest Conference teams for the 1952 college football season.  The selectors for the 1952 season included the Associated Press (AP) and the United Press (UP).  Players selected as first-team players by both the AP and UP are designated in bold.

All Southwest selections

Backs
 Ray Graves, Texas A&M (UP-1)
 Gib Dawson, Texas (UP-1)
 Jerry Coody, Baylor (UP-1)
 Dick Ochoa, Texas (UP-1)

Ends
 Tom Stolhandske, Texas (UP-1)
 Wayne Martin, TCU (UP-1)

Tackles
 Jack Little, Texas A&M (UP-1)
 Bill Forester, SMU (UP-1)

Guards
 Harley Sewell, Texas (UP-1)
 Bill Athay, Baylor (UP-1)

Centers
 Jack Sisco, Baylor (UP-1)

Key
AP = Associated Press

UP = United Press

Bold = Consensus first-team selection of both the AP and UP

See also
1952 College Football All-America Team

References

All-Southwest Conference
All-Southwest Conference football teams